Richard Wyot   was a priest and academic in the late fifteenth and early sixteenth centuries.

Wyot was educated at Christ's College, Cambridge, graduating B.A. in 1493; MA in 1496; and B.D. in 1507.  He was Fellow of Christ's from 1496 to 1506; and Master from 1506 to 1508.  He held livings at Wigan, Cambridge and Bingham

He died in July 1522.

References 

Alumni of Christ's College, Cambridge
Fellows of Christ's College, Cambridge
Masters of Christ's College, Cambridge
1522 deaths